Russian gubernatorial elections in 2012 took place on 14 October in Amur, Bryansk, Belgorod, Novgorod and Ryazan oblasts.

The ballots in governors’ elections in the Amur, Belgorod and Ryazan regions had four names to choose from. The ballot in the Novgorod region contained three names. In total, 17 candidates from six political parties competed for five governor seats. The parties represented the State Duma's "big four" United Russia, the Communists, the Liberal-Democratic Party and A Just Russia, as well as Right Cause and Patriots of Russia. Candidates from LDPR competed in four regions, those from the Communist Party of the Russian Federation in three, Right Course and Patriots of Russia were represented in two regions, and A Just Russia in one.

The Russian Interior Ministry released a statement saying "To ensure law and order and public security, over 102,000 police and interior troops, 2,800-strong staff of private security firms and 3,900 representatives of voluntary people's squads, public formations and Cossacks will be involved during the holding of the Unified Voting Day".

Race summary

References

2012
2012 elections in Russia
October 2012 events in Russia